Olaf in der Beek (born 31 July 1967) is a German politician of the Free Democratic Party (FDP) who has been serving as a member of the Bundestag from the state of North Rhine-Westphalia since 2017.

Early life and career 
After obtaining his advanced technical college entrance qualification, in der Beek began studying business administration at the Bochum University of Applied Sciences, which he was unable to complete for family reasons. 

Until the completion of his studies, in der Beek worked as advisor to a member of the State Parliament of North Rhine-Westphalia before moving to the media industry in 1993. After being promoted to an executive in the publishing and printing industry, he became self-employed in the media industry in 2008 and was managing partner of a medium-sized affiliated company before moving to the German Bundestag.

Political career 
After being active in the FDP and the Young Liberals in der Beek in the 1980s, his membership was then suspended for 20 years and he finally resigned from the party, he re-registered with the Free Democrats in 2013.

In parliament, in der Beek serves on the Committee on Economic Cooperation and Development (since 2018), the Committee on the Environment, Nature Conservation and Nuclear Safety (since 2018) and the Subcommittee on International Climate and Energy Policy (since 2022). Since the 2021 elections, he has been serving as his parliamentary group’s spokesperson for climate action.

In addition to his committee assignments, in der Beek is part of the German Parliamentary Friendship Group for Relations with the Southern African States and the German Parliamentary Friendship Group for Relations with Arabic-Speaking States in the Middle East.

In the negotiations to form a so-called traffic light coalition of the Social Democratic Party (SPD), the Green Party and the FDP following the 2021 German elections, in der Beek was part of his party's delegation in the working group on environmental policy, co-chaired by Rita Schwarzelühr-Sutter, Steffi Lemke and Stefan Birkner.

Other activities 
 German Foundation for World Population (DSW), Member of the Parliamentary Advisory Board
 German-Jordanian Society, Member of the Parliamentary Advisory Board

References

External links 

  
 Bundestag biography 

1967 births
Living people
People from Bochum
Members of the Bundestag for North Rhine-Westphalia
Members of the Bundestag 2017–2021
Members of the Bundestag 2021–2025
Members of the Bundestag for the Free Democratic Party (Germany)